EOST may refer to:
 Ecole et Observatoire des Sciences de la Terre, a French school and Observatory
 The Ecstasy of Saint Theresa (band), a Czech dance music band active 1990–present